Craigleith Provincial Park was established in 1967 by Ontario Parks. It is  a recreation-class provincial park created to help preserve historic oil shale beach. Craigleith Provincial Park is a small park located between Collingwood and Thornbury ( west of Collingwood) on the southern shores of Georgian Bay.

History

The park was created by Regulation 245/67, Schedule 59 of the Provincial Parks Act in 1967. The province acquired two parcels of land along Highway 26 as well as lands along former railway line. Only lands north of Highway 26 became an active park.

Facilities

Park Office

The Park Office is located on Ontario Highway 26 near Blue Mountain ski resort. The park is open during the months of May to October.

Campgrounds

Main Campground

The campground has 172 campsites of which 66 have electric service.  There is a comfort station and shower building including laundry facilities and flush toilets. Potable water taps are also found at various locations outside the Day Use area. All the campsites in the camping area are within easy walking distance of the beach. A children's adventure playground is located next to the shower building. Firewood is available for purchase at the gatehouse next to the Park Store.

Day Use

The park is opened to day use and closed after 10pm daily after which only registered campers can remain overnight.

Ecology The rock

Fractured oil shale plates on the shore contain invertebrate fossils 455 million years old.

From 1859 to 1863 the Craigleith Shale Oil Works plant was opened by William Darley Pollard to the east of the park extracted bituminous oil shale. The process failed due inefficiency and the production closed shortly after 1863. The Craigleith Shale Oil Works Historical Plaques is located at the site.

Reminders in the park brochures remind visitors not to take any shale as souvenirs as the act of doing so is illegal.

Shipwreck

Steamer Mary Ward carrying coal oil, salt and passengers from Sarnia to Collingwood grounded off the shores of the park in 1872 after the captain mistook a tavern light for Collingwood harbour light. Eight lives were lost and parts of the steamer are found near the site where it sank.

See also
 List of Ontario provincial parks

References

External links

 
 

Provincial parks of Ontario
Parks in Algoma District
Protected areas established in 1967
1967 establishments in Ontario
Campsites in Canada